"An Alarc'h" ("The Swan") is a Breton traditional song. It is found in the 1839 collection Barzaz Breiz.  It tells of the return from exile in England of the Breton prince Jean de Montfort (known as "The Swan of Montfort") and his defeat of the French army under Bertrand du Guesclin in 1379. It has been recorded by, amongst others, Alan Stivell and Gilles Servat.

The Scottish folk song "The Twa Corbies", a variation of the English song "The Three Ravens", was set to the tune of "An Alarc'h" by R.M. Blythman.

Lyrics 
(From the Barzaz Breiz of 1839)

Recordings
 À l'Olympia, Alan Stivell (1972, Fontana, 6399 005)
 Je Ne Hurlerai Pas Avec Les Loups, Gilles Servat (1983, Kalondour, 814 362-1)
 Tri Yann an Naoned, Tri Yann (1972, Kelenn, 6332 626)
 Hanternoz, (August 2013)
 Molène, Didier Squiban (1997, L'Oz Production – L'OZ 17)

References

Breton folk songs
Year of song unknown
Songwriter unknown